The Jewish Policy Center, founded in 1985 and located in Washington, D.C. is a 501c(3) non-profit think tank providing perspectives and analysis by leading scholars and academics on fields such as "American defense capability, U.S.-Israel relations", and "advocates for small government, low taxes, free trade, fiscal responsibility, energy security, as well as free speech and intellectual diversity". 

According to Matthew Brooks, Executive Director of both the Jewish Policy Center and the Republican Jewish Coalition, the Policy Center is nonpartisan and focuses solely on issues, both foreign and domestic. Center fellows include Norman Podhoretz, Michael Medved  and Ruth Wisse.

The Center has sponsored many forums around the country billed as "Liberal Roots, Conservative Solutions". It has lobbied for school vouchers,  supported the Israeli withdrawal from Gaza,  and worked to draw attention to  antisemitism on American college campuses.

References

External links
 Official website
 Jewish Policy Center on the C-SPAN Network

Jewish-American political organizations